Francisco Sandoval (born 31 January 1924, date of death unknown) was a Guatemalan sports shooter. He competed at the 1952 Summer Olympics and 1968 Summer Olympics.

References

1924 births
Year of death missing
Guatemalan male sport shooters
Olympic shooters of Guatemala
Shooters at the 1952 Summer Olympics
Shooters at the 1968 Summer Olympics
People from Chiquimula Department